Nahanni is a 1962 short documentary from the National Film Board of Canada directed by Donald Wilder, following Albert Faille, an elderly explorer and prospector, down the Nahanni River, in search of a legendary gold mine. The film is scripted by William Weintraub with a musical score by Eldon Rathburn. Awards for the film included two prizes at the 15th Canadian Film Awards in 1963, as well as the award for Best Colour Film Produced in 1962 at the Canadian Cinematography Awards.

References

External links
Watch Nahanni at NFB.ca

1962 films
1960s short documentary films
National Film Board of Canada documentaries
1962 documentary films
Films shot in the Northwest Territories
Films scored by Eldon Rathburn
Best Theatrical Short Film Genie and Canadian Screen Award winners
Canadian short documentary films
1960s Canadian films